"Off the Hook" is the first single released from Jody Watley's sixth album, Flower.

History
"Off the Hook" was the first single released by Watley to reach the Billboard Hot 100 since 1993, peaking at #73.  It also reached the Hot R&B Singles Chart, peaking at #23.  The song became her fifth chart topper on the Billboard Hot Dance Club Play.  It also charted on the UK Singles Chart, reaching #51.

A remixed version featuring rapper Rakim was also released.

Charts

References

Jody Watley songs
1998 singles
Atlantic Records singles